Yahya Ali Ahmed al-Raee (born 1 January 1953) is Yemeni politician and was speaker of the Yemeni House of Representatives from 2008 to 2019.

He is a member of General People's Congress, and was elected in February 2008 to succeed Abdullah ibn Husayn al-Ahmar who died in office.

Following the Yemeni civil war since 2015, only semi-regular sessions of the legislature were held in San'aa.

References

Living people
Speakers of the House of Representatives (Yemen)
General People's Congress (Yemen) politicians
People from Dhamar Governorate
1953 births